The Arab Boy is a pub in Putney, London.

Location 
The pub is on the south side of the Upper Richmond road at number 289.

History 
The pub is one of the oldest in Putney and is named after Yussef Sirrie, the middle eastern servant of local solicitor and property developer Henry Scarth (buried in Putney Lower Common Cemetery) who built the pub in 1849, as well as the former Quill pub nearby.  Sirrie later became landlord of the pub after Scarth left his estate to him on his death.

Management 
The pub was owned by Watney and later by the Magic pub company, from 1996 it was owned by Greene King and in 2016 it was taken over by the same company as owned the Market Porter pub in London Bridge.  As of 2021 the pub is 'independently owned'.

Transport 
The pub is served by Transport for London buses 337 and 430 which stop on the Upper Richmond road, East Putney tube station (District line) is at 15-minute walk and Putney railway station (Southwestern Railway) is a 10-minute walk.

The Santander Cycles Putney rail station docking station is a 10-minute walk.

References

External links 
 The Arab Boy pub website

Pubs in the London Borough of Wandsworth
Putney